Robert Logan Jack (16 September 1845 – 6 November 1921) was government geologist in Queensland, Australia, for twenty years. There is a minor waterway on Cape York; Logan Jack Creek, whose outflow is located some 7 kilometres from Ussher Point, which is named after him.

Early life
Jack was born at Irvine, in Ayrshire, Scotland the son of Robert Jack, a cabinet-maker, and his wife Margaret, née Logan. He was educated at the Irvine academy and Edinburgh university and had some 10 years' experience with the geological survey of Scotland.

Queensland
Jack was appointed geologist for northern Queensland in March 1876. He arrived in the colony in April 1877, and soon afterwards was made geologist for the whole colony, succeeding Richard Daintree. An early piece of work was an examination of the coal resources of the Cooktown district, and in August 1879 he began an exploring expedition to the most northerly part of Queensland in the hope that payable goldfields might be found. A second expedition was made towards the end of the year, and though no field of any great value was discovered, much was added to the knowledge of the country. The party endured many hardships and Jack himself was speared through the shoulder by hostile aborigines. In 1880 he published a work on the Mineral Wealth of Queensland, a Handbook to Queensland Geology appeared in 1886, and in 1892 with Robert Etheridge, Junior, The Geology and Palaeontology of Queensland and New Guinea was published in two volumes. In 1888 Andrew Gibb Maitland was assigned Second Assistant Geologist and reported to Jack.

Jack resigned his appointment in 1899, during his time there he mapped the coal sites in Bowen, Flinders River and Townsville. He reported on many gold, tin, silver and sapphire areas, and his early work led to the search for artesian water and the construction of the first government bore in the Great Artesian Basin. He was also a prolific author on the geology, mineralogy and paleontology of Queensland.

Further travels
In January 1900 Jack led an expedition to China starting from near Shanghai up the Yangtze River. In June, while at Chengdu, word was received of the Boxer Rebellion, and the explorers, eventually found a way out through Burma. The Back Blocks of China, published in 1904, gives an account of the experiences of the party. In 1901 Jack returned to England and took up private practice, but in 1904 came to Australia again and did work for the government of Western Australia. From 1907 he resided at Sydney where he died in 1921. He was survived by a son, Robert Lockhart Jack, also well known in Australia as a geologist. At the time of his death he had recently completed his Northmost Australia, an interesting account of exploration in northern Queensland, especially valuable for its accounts of the less known men, which was published in London in 1921. He was elected a fellow of the Geological Society in 1870, he received the honorary degree of LL.D. from Glasgow university, and in conjunction with Etheridge was awarded the Clarke memorial medal by the Royal Society of New South Wales in 1895.

Publications
Northmost Australia, George Robertson and Co., Sydney, 1922, reprinted by Hesperian Press, Western Australia, 1998, 
With Robert Etheridge junior, The Geology and Paleontology of Queensland and New Guinea
Handbook of Queensland Geology

References

Jack,Felicity, '', Putting Queensland on the Map - the Life of Robert Logan Jack - geologist and explorer, UNSW Press, 2008
Dorothy Hill, 'Jack, Robert Logan (1845-1921)', Australian Dictionary of Biography, Vol. 4, MUP, 1972, p. 466.

1845 births
1921 deaths
Australian geologists